Hot Line is an American erotic anthology series featured on Cinemax. The series features simulated sex scenes, and thus can be categorized as "softcore" or "voyeur".

The premise of the show is listeners of a fictional radio show titled, "Hot Line", call in to recount their sexual exploits. Many high-profile porn stars made an appearance on the show.

Episodes

Season 1 (1995)
 "Voyeur" – January 6, 1995
 "Highest Bidder" – January 13, 1995
 "The Homecoming" – January 20, 1995
 "Vision of Love" – January 27, 1995
 "Payback" – February 3, 1995
 "Fountain of Youth" – February 10, 1995

Season 2 (1996)
 "Hung Jury" – July 5, 1996
 "The Sitter" – July 12, 1996
 "E-Mail" – July 19, 1996
 "Sleepless Nights" – July 26, 1996
 "Sexual Chemistry" – August 2, 1996
 "Hannah's Surprise" – August 9, 1996
 "The Gardener" – August 16, 1996
 "Shutterbugs" – August 23, 1996
 "Double Exposure" – August 30, 1996
 "Where Were We" – September 13, 1996
 "Brunch Club" – September 20, 1996
 "Mistaken Identity" – September 27, 1996

External links

 

1990s American drama television series
1995 American television series debuts
1996 American television series endings
1990s American anthology television series
Cinemax original programming
Television series by Warner Bros. Television Studios
Erotic television series
English-language television shows
Erotic drama television series